DJ Vix is a British-Asian DJ/music producer. He is known for his bhangra tracks and remixes.

Early life 
He was born and raised in East London.

Career 
In 1996, he formed the Dhol n Bass Roadshow, which won many awards. He has worked in Vancouver, Rotterdam, Africa, Norway, Melbourne, Sydney, Perth, LA, Chicago, Washington DC, New York, Jumeirah and Delhi (Club Elevate).

Guest mixes and shows on the Asian radio scene have included BBC Radio 1, BBC 1xtra and BBC Asian Network. He was signed in 2002 by Moviebox. DJ Vix has received international recognition as a producer of mainstream Asian beats.

Following his debut album Dhol N Bass Uncut (2002), he produced his next three albums Vix It Up (2004) and Identical 2 None (2007) and Moviebox Vix Tape (2008) with 'Ah Chak Bottle Daru Di' featuring Shin from DCS. On the BBC Asian Network Vix Tape topped the list for a record-breaking 13 weeks.

In 2009 DJ Vix received his third award, 'Best Club DJ' at the UK Asian Music Awards (UK AMA). In 2011, DJ Vix worked in collaboration with Surinder Shinda and Bhinda Jatt (also known as California Bhangra King).

DJ Vix has worked with artists like Miss Pooja, RnB superstar Jay Sean, Sukbir, Taz Stereo Nation, B21, XLNC, Debi Muksuspuri, H-Dhami and Ajay the ‘Brit Asia Superstar’ winner of 2010. In 2014, DJ Vix worked in collaboration with Malkit Singh MBE, and produced the track 'Desi Beat'. In 2014, he released 'Marda' feat Hunterz, along with the new album My Turn from Manjit Pappu. His fifth solo album, Chapter V was released on 26 February 2015.

Personal life 
DJ Vix married in June 2019.

Awards

Discography

Albums

Singles

References

External links
DJ Vix's Official Website

Bhangra (music) musicians